The rufous-thighed hawk (Accipiter erythronemius) is a small hawk found from southern Brazil and southeastern Bolivia to Paraguay, Uruguay and northern Argentina. It is usually considered a subspecies of the sharp-shinned hawk by most taxonomists, including the American Ornithological Society, but the taxonomy is far from resolved, with some authorities considering the southern taxa to represent three separate species: white-breasted hawk (A. chionogaster), plain-breasted hawk (A. ventralis), and rufous-thighed hawk (A. erythronemius).

Taxonomy
The breeding ranges of the rufous-thighed and sharp-shinned hawk is entirely allopatric. This allopatry combined with differences in plumage (see appearance) and, apparently, certain measurements, has been the background for the split, but hard scientific data are presently lacking (AOU).

Description

As common in Accipiter hawks, females are distinctly larger in size, averaging some 30% longer, and with a weight advantage of more than 50% being common. Measurements given here are for the sharp-shinned hawk, but they are comparable for the remaining species. Adults have short broad wings and a medium-length tail banded in blackish and gray with the tip varying among individuals from slightly notched through square to slightly rounded (often narrowly tipped white). The remiges (typically only visible in flight) are whitish barred blackish. The legs are long and very slender (hence the common name) and yellow. The hooked bill is black and the cere is yellowish.

The rufous-thighed hawk resembles the sharp-shinned hawk, but upperparts are darker, streaking to underparts rufous or dusky, cheeks are typically with a clear rufous patch (occasionally lacking almost entirely) and iris is yellow (contra illustrations in some books). Juveniles resemble juveniles of sharp-shinneds, but streaking to the underparts are typically restricted to throat and central underparts, with flanks scaled or barred (often also the belly).

Distribution
The species is found in Uruguay, Paraguay, north-eastern Argentina and south-eastern Bolivia. It is, as far as known, resident in some regions and migratory in others. The movements are generally poorly understood, but it only occurs seasonally at some localities in Argentina. The rufous-thighed hawk is found in tropical and subtropical regions; both in lowlands and highlands.

Diet
These birds surprise and capture most of their prey from cover or while flying quickly through dense vegetation. They are adept at navigating dense thickets, although this hunting method is often hazardous to the hawk. The great majority of this hawk's prey are small birds, especially various songbirds such as sparrows, wood-warblers, finches, wrens, nuthatches, tits, icterids and thrushes. Typically, males will target smaller birds, such as sparrows and wood-warblers, and females will pursue larger prey, such as thrushes and flickers, leading to a lack of conflict between the sexes for prey. They often pluck the feathers off their prey on a post or other perch. Rarely, rufous-thighed hawks will also eat rodents, lizards, frogs, snakes, and large insects.

Reproduction
Rufous-thighed hawks construct a stick nest. Clutches of 3 to 8 eggs have been recorded, but 4 to 5 eggs is the typical clutch size. The incubation period is thought to average at about 30 days. After hatching, the young are brooded for 16 to 23 days by the female, while the male defends the territory and catches prey. The young fledge at the age of about a month and rely on their parents for feeding and protection another four weeks. The breeding behavior of the rufous-thighed hawk is comparably poorly known, but based on the available knowledge they appear to differ little from that of sharp-shinned hawks.

Conservation
The rufous-thighed hawk is fairly common (but easily overlooked due to their secretive behavior) and presently considered safe.

References

 Dickinson, E. (2003). The Howard and Moore Complete Checklist of the Birds of the World. Christopher Helm. 
 Ferguson-Lees, J., D. Christie, P. Burton, K. Franklin & D. Mead (2001). Raptors of the World. Christopher Helm. 
 Sick, H. (1993). Birds in Brazil: A Natural History. Princeton University Press. 

rufous-thighed hawk
Birds of Brazil
Birds of Paraguay
Birds of Uruguay
Birds of Argentina
rufous-thighed hawk